"Keep Tryin'" is a song by American R&B group Groove Theory recorded for their debut album Groove Theory (1995). The song was released as the album's second single in January 1996.

Track listings
12", Vinyl
"Keep Tryin'" (Radio Edit) - 3:57
"Keep Tryin'" (Instrumental) - 4:17
"Keep Tryin'" (LP Version) - 4:20
"Keep Tryin'" (Acapella) - 3:57

12", Vinyl
"Keep Tryin'" (Hip Hop Mix w/ Rap) - 4:25
"Keep Tryin'" (Go-Go Mix) - 4:21
"Keep Tryin'" (Hip Hop Mix w/o Rap) - 4:25
"Keep Tryin'" (The Dream Sequence) - 4:35
"Keep Tryin'" (The Dream Sequence Instrumental) - 4:03
"Keep Tryin'" (The Wet Mix) - 7:00

Personnel
Information taken from Discogs.
bass – Eric "EBO" Butler
engineering – Angela Piva
executive production – Jimmy Henchmen, Amel Larrieux, Bryce Wilson
keyboards – Bryce Wilson
mastering – Chris Gehringer
production – Bryce Wilson
vocals (background) – Amel Larrieux

Chart performance

Notes

External links

1996 singles
Groove Theory songs
1996 songs
Epic Records singles
Songs written by Bryce Wilson
Contemporary R&B ballads
1990s ballads